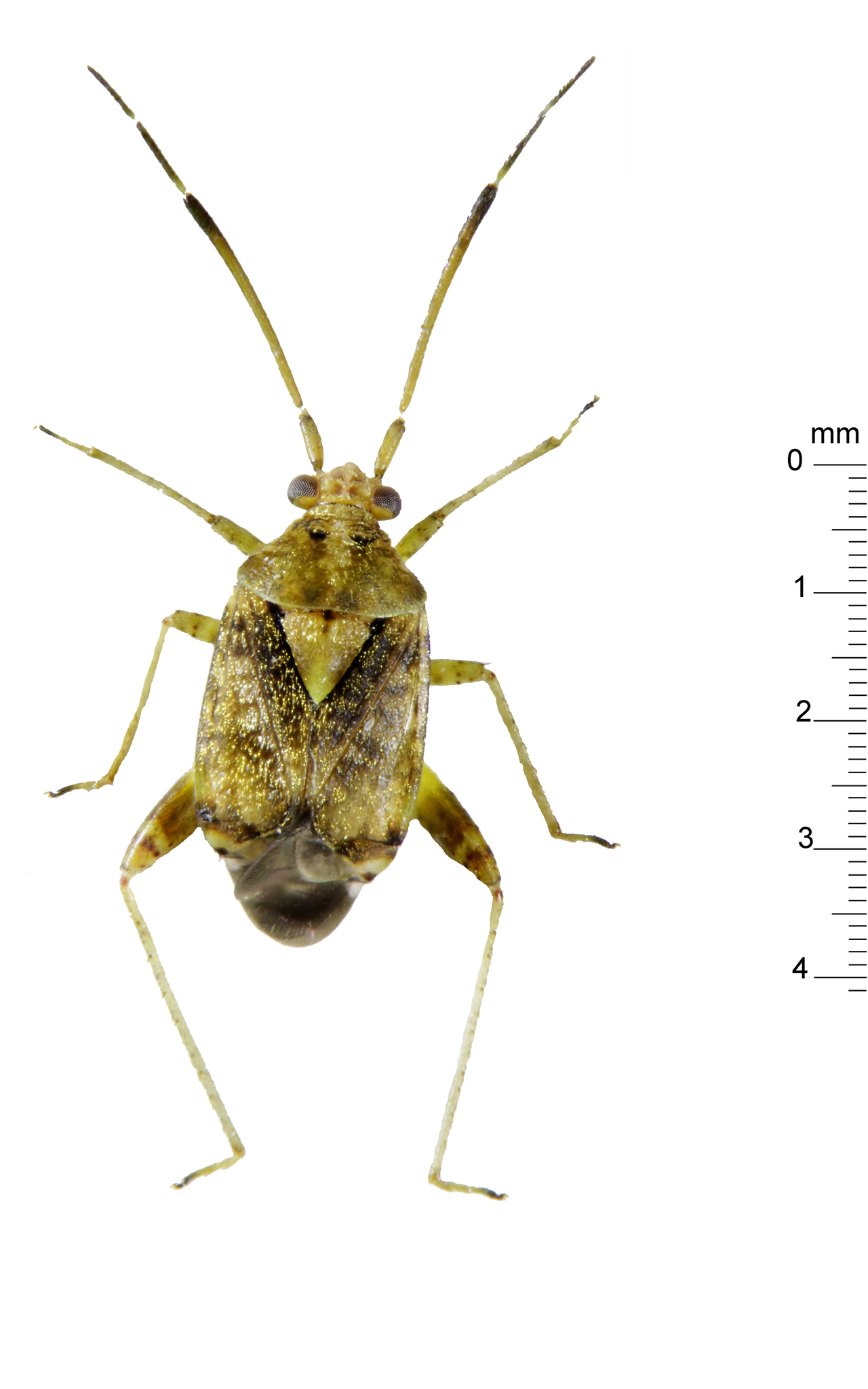

Scientific classification
- Kingdom: Animalia
- Phylum: Arthropoda
- Class: Insecta
- Order: Hemiptera
- Suborder: Heteroptera
- Family: Miridae
- Genus: Sidnia
- Species: S. kinbergi

Binomial name
- Sidnia kinbergi (Stal, 1859)

= Sidnia kinbergi =

Species of insect

Sidnia kinbergi, also known by its common name Australian crop mirid is a species from the genus Sidnia.
